The Edward E. Smith Memorial Award for Imaginative Fiction, or Skylark, annually recognizes someone for lifetime contributions to science fiction, "both through work in the field and by exemplifying the personal qualities which made the late 'Doc' Smith well-loved by those who knew him". It is presented by the New England Science Fiction Association at its annual convention, Boskone, to someone chosen by a vote of NESFA members. The trophy is a large lens mounted on a simple plinth.

The award was inaugurated in 1966, the year after Smith's death. Fifty-six people have been honored in 54 years to 2020. Hal Clement received the award twice, in 1969 and 1997.

Skylark recipients

 1966  Frederik Pohl
 1967  Isaac Asimov
 1968  John W. Campbell
 1969  Hal Clement
 1970  Judy-Lynn Benjamin del Rey
 1971  no award
 1972  Lester del Rey
 1973  Larry Niven
 1974  Ben Bova
 1975  Gordon R. Dickson
 1976  Anne McCaffrey
 1977  Jack Gaughan
 1978  Spider Robinson
 1979  David Gerrold
 1980  Jack L. Chalker
 1981  Frank Kelly Freas
 1982  Poul Anderson
 1983  Andre Norton
 1984  Robert Silverberg
 1985  Jack Williamson
 1986  Wilson (Bob) Tucker
 1987  Vincent Di Fate
 1988  C. J. Cherryh
 1989  Gene Wolfe
 1990  Jane Yolen
 1991  David Cherry
 1992  Orson Scott Card
 1993  Tom Doherty
 1994  Esther M. Friesner
 1995  Mike Resnick
 1996  Joe Haldeman and Gay Haldeman
 1997  Hal Clement
 1998  James White
 1999  Bob Eggleton 
 2000  Bruce Coville
 2001  Ellen Asher
 2002  Dave Langford 
 2003  Patrick Nielsen Hayden and Teresa Nielsen Hayden
 2004  George R.R. Martin
 2005  Tamora Pierce
 2006  David G. Hartwell
 2007  Beth Meacham
 2008  Charles Stross
 2009  Terry Pratchett
 2010  Omar Rayyan
 2011  Lois McMaster Bujold
 2012  Sharon Lee and Steve Miller
 2013  Ginjer Buchanan
 2014  Robert J. Sawyer
 2015  Moshe Feder
 2016  Gardner Dozois
 2017  Jo Walton
 2018  Daniel M. Kimmel
 2019 Melinda M. Snodgrass
 2020 Betsy Wollheim
 2021 Anthony R. Lewis

See also 

 Science fiction fandom
 List of science fiction awards

References

External links 
 NESFA

Regional and local science fiction awards
Awards established in 1966